A special purpose acquisition company (SPAC), also known as a "blank check company", is a shell corporation listed on a stock exchange with the purpose of acquiring a private company, thus making it public without going through the traditional initial public offering process and the associated regulations thereof. According to the U.S. Securities and Exchange Commission (SEC), SPACs are created specifically to pool funds to finance a future merger or acquisition opportunity within a set timeframe; these opportunities usually have yet to be identified while raising funds. 

In the US, SPACs are registered with the SEC and considered publicly-traded companies. The general public may buy their shares on stock exchanges before any merger or acquisition takes place. For this reason they have at times been referred to as the "poor man's private equity funds". The majority of companies pursuing SPACs do so on the Nasdaq or New York Stock Exchange in the US, although other exchanges, such as the Euronext Amsterdam, Singapore Exchange, and Hong Kong Stock Exchange, have also overseen a small volume of SPAC deals.

Despite the popularity and growth in the number of SPACs, academic analysis shows investor returns on SPAC companies post-merger are almost uniformly negative, although investors in SPACs and merged companies with may earn excess returns immediately after the merger. Proliferation of SPACs usually accelerates around periods of economic bubbles, such as the "everything bubble" between 2020 and 2021.

Characteristics

Mechanics
SPACs generally trade as units or as separate common shares and warrants on the Nasdaq and New York Stock Exchange (as of 2008) once the public offering has been declared effective by the SEC, distinguishing the SPAC from a blank check company formed under SEC Rule 419. Commonly, units are denoted with the letter "u" (for unit) appended to the ticker symbol of SPAC shares.

Trading liquidity of the SPAC's securities provide investors with a flexible exit strategy. In addition, the public currency enhances the position of the SPAC when negotiating a business combination with a potential merger or acquisition target. The common share price must be added to the trading price of the warrants to get an accurate picture of the SPAC's performance.

By market convention, 85% to 100% of the proceeds raised in the IPO for the SPAC are held in trust to be used at a later date for the merger or acquisition. A SPAC's trust account can only be used to fund a shareholder-approved business combination or to return capital to public shareholders at a charter extension or business combination approval meeting.

Each SPAC has its own liquidation window within which it must complete a merger or an acquisition; past this deadline the SPAC will dissolve and return assets to its stockholders. In practice, SPAC sponsors often extend the life of a SPAC by making a contribution to the trust account to entice shareholders to vote in favor of a charter amendment that delays the liquidation date.

In addition, the target of the acquisition must have a fair market value that is equal to at least 80% of the SPAC's net assets at the time of acquisition. Previous SPAC structures required a positive shareholder vote by 80% of the SPAC's public shareholders for the transaction to be consummated.  However, current SPAC provisions do not require a shareholder vote for the transaction to be consummated unless as follows:

Governance
To allow for stockholders of the SPAC to make an informed decision on whether they wish to approve the business combination, the company must make full disclosure to stockholders of the target business, including complete audited financials, and terms of the proposed business combination via an SEC merger proxy statement. All common share stockholders of the SPAC are granted voting rights at a shareholder meeting to approve or reject the proposed business combination. A number of SPACs have also been placed on the London Stock Exchange AIM exchange. These SPACs do not have the aforementioned voting thresholds.

Since the financial crisis, protections for common shareholders have been implemented, allowing stockholders to vote in favor of a deal and still redeem their shares for a pro-rata share of the trust account. (This is significantly different from the blind pool – blank check companies of the 1980s, which were a form of limited partnership that did not specify what investment opportunities the company plans to pursue.) The assets of the trust are only released if a business combination is approved by the voting shareholders, or a business combination is not consummated within the amount of time allowed by a company's articles of incorporation.

Management
The SPAC is usually led by a management team composed of three or more members with prior private equity, mergers and acquisitions, and/or operating experience. The management team of a SPAC typically receives 20% of the equity in the vehicle at the time of offering, exclusive of the value of the warrants. The equity is usually held in escrow for 2–3 years and management normally agrees to purchase warrants or units from the company in a private placement immediately prior to the offering. The proceeds from this sponsor investment (usually equal to between 2% to 8% of the amount being raised in the public offering) are placed in the trust and distributed to public stockholders in the event of liquidation.

No salaries, finder's fees, or other cash compensation are paid to the management team prior to the business combination, and the management team does not participate in a liquidating distribution if it fails to consummate a successful business combination. In many cases, management teams agree to pay for the expenses in excess of the trusts if there is a liquidation of the SPAC because no target has been found. Conflicts of interest are minimized within the SPAC structure because all management teams agree to offer suitable prospective target businesses to the SPAC before any other acquisition fund, subject to pre-existing fiduciary duties. The SPAC is further prohibited from consummating a business combination with any entity affiliated with an insider, unless a fairness opinion from an independent investment banking firm states that the combination is fair to the shareholders.

Banking
SPAC Research, an entity running a SPAC database, maintains an underwriter league table which can be sorted by bookrunner volume or other criteria for any year or selection of years.  I-Bankers Securities Inc. stated that it had participated in 132 SPAC IPOs as lead or co-manager since 2004. In the years leading up to 2021, bulge bracket banks started participating in more SPAC IPOs, with Cantor Fitzgerald & Co. and Deutsche Bank Securities Inc. on the cover of 30 SPAC IPOs from 2015 to August 2019. Citigroup, Credit Suisse, Goldman Sachs, and BofA have all built a significant SPAC practice, while Cantor Fitzgerald led all SPAC underwriters in 2019 by book-running 14 SPACs that raised over US$3.08 billion in IPO proceeds.

SPACs in Europe
In July 2007, Pan-European Hotel Acquisition Company N.V. was the first SPAC offering listed on the Euronext Amsterdam, raising approximately €115 million. I-Bankers Securities has been the underwriter with CRT Capital Group as lead-underwriter. That listing on NYSE Euronext (Amsterdam) was followed by Liberty International Acquisition Company, raising €600 million in January 2008. Liberty is the third largest SPAC in the world and the largest outside the U.S.A. The first German SPAC was Germany1 Acquisition Ltd., which raised $437.2 million at Euronext Amsterdam with Deutsche Bank and I-Bankers Securities as underwriters. Loyens & Loeff served as legal counsels in The Netherlands.

In March 2021, a report prepared by Lord Hill for the Chancellor of Exchequer recommended a series of changes to London company listing rules to make them more favorable to SPAC listings. Among the report's proposals is to reduce the percentage of shares that must be offered to the public from 25% to 15%.

SPACs in Asia 
On March 18, Aquila Acquisition Corp debuted on the Hong Kong Exchanges and Clearing Limited (HKEX). The IPO received lukewarm reception by investors, with shares down 3% in the two-week period post-IPO. Despite this decrease, there is a high demand for SPAC public offerings in Hong Kong, with HKEX reporting that they have received applications for 11 additional SPAC IPOs.

SPACs in emerging markets
Emerging market focused SPACs, particularly those seeking to consummate a business combination in China, have been incorporating a 30/36 month timeline to account for the additional time that it has taken previous similar entities to successfully open their business combinations.

History

Since the 1990s, SPACs have existed in the technology, healthcare, logistics, media, retail and telecommunications industries. Their history began with investment bank GKN Securities, specifically, founders David Nussbaum, Roger Gladstone, and Robert Gladstone, who later founded EarlyBirdCapital with Steve Levine and David Miller (currently managing partner of Graubard Miller law firm) and who developed the template.

SPAC IPOs have seen resurgent interest since 2014, with increasing amounts of capital flowing to them:

The success of SPACs in building equity value for their shareholders has drawn interest from investors such as Bill Ackman who had backed three SPACs as of 2015, including the SPAC that took Burger King public.

Regulation
In the US the SPAC public offering structure is governed by the Securities and Exchange Commission (SEC). A public offering for a SPAC is typically filed with the SEC under an S-1 registration statement (or an F-1 for a foreign private issuer) and is classified by the SEC under SIC code 6770 - Blank Checks. Full disclosure of the SPAC structure, target industries or geographic regions, management team biographies, share ownership, potential conflicts of interest and risk factors are standard material covered in the S-1 registration statement. It is believed that the SEC has studied SPACs to determine whether they require special regulations to ensure that these vehicles are not abused as blind pool trusts and blank-check corporations have been over the years. Many believe that SPACs do have corporate governance mechanisms in place to protect shareholders. SPACs listed on the American Stock Exchange are required to be Sarbanes-Oxley compliant at the time of the offering, including such mandatory requirements as a majority of the board of directors being independent, and having audit and compensation committees.

Statistics
According to an industry study published in January 2019, from 2004 through 2018, approximately $49.14 billion was raised across 332 SPAC IPOs in the US. In that period, 2018 was the largest year for SPAC issuance since 2007, with 46 SPAC IPOs raising approximately $10.74 billion. SPACs seeking an acquisition in the energy sector raised $1.4bn in 2018, after raising a record $3.9bn in 2017. NASDAQ was the most common listing exchange for SPACs in 2018, with 34 SPACs raising $6.4bn. GS Acquisition Holdings Corp. and Churchill Capital Corp. raised the largest SPACs of 2018, with $690mm each in IPO proceeds. In 2019, 59 SPAC IPO's raised $13.6 billion. Nearly 250 SPACs raised more than $83 billion in 2020. In the first month of 2021 there were 75 SPACs.

In a March 2020 event, Allison Lee, acting chair of the SEC, said that the "investment returns don't match the hype surrounding the SPAC bubble".

See also
 Capital formation
 Direct listing
 Initial public offering
 Reverse IPO
 Special-purpose entity

References

Bibliography

External links
 Investopedia
 Blank Check Company
 Article about SPACs in the entertainment industry

 
Corporate finance
Private equity